Ulf Miehe (11 May 1940 – 13 July 1989) was a German screenwriter and film director. His 1975 film John Glückstadt was entered into the 25th Berlin International Film Festival.

Selected filmography
 Jaider, der einsame Jäger (1971, directed by Volker Vogeler)
 Output (1974, directed by Michael Fengler)
 John Glückstadt (1975)
 Der Unsichtbare (1987)

References

External links

1940 births
1989 deaths
People from Ostprignitz-Ruppin
Film people from Brandenburg
German male writers
German crime fiction writers
Male novelists
20th-century screenwriters